Céline: A Biography ("the life of Céline") is a 1988 book by the French writer Frédéric Vitoux, on the author Louis-Ferdinand Céline. It was published in English in 1992.

Reception
James Sallis wrote in The Washington Post:
Biographer Vitoux, already a celebrated authority, surely has here the last word on Celine. His book is a marvel of research, of inclusiveness and discursive narration. It is also a marvel of balance, with the biographer, rather like his subject (and for all his obvious passion) standing forever curiously apart from the observing. ... If at the end of Vitoux's watershed work we still fail to know Celine fully, it has nothing to do with Vitoux's labors or insight, and everything to do with the simple fact that finally each of us remains a mystery.

Publishers Weekly wrote: "The book provides a stunning portrait of Celine's progressive withdrawal from reality, accompanied by persecution manias, constant headaches and auditory hallucinations. Vitoux limns a prophet of decadence who hated war and colonialism and rattled the complacency of the well-to-do by proposing that cruel egoism dwells in the heart of every individual." Kirkus Reviews called the book a "sympathetic, perfectly tuned biography of France's most word-wild, controversial novelist ever".

References

External links
 French publicity page 

1988 non-fiction books
Biographies about writers
Éditions Grasset books
French biographies
French-language books
Louis-Ferdinand Céline